Hilary Weeks (née, Novakovich; born March 7, 1970) is an American Christian musician and Latter-Day Saint singer, who primarily plays a worship and gospel music version of Christian country and Christian pop. She has released ten musical works, with eight of those being studio albums, He Hears Me (1996), Lead Me Home (1998) and I Will Not Forget (2000), Day of Praise (2004), If I Only Had Today (2008), Every Step (2011), Say Love (2013), Say Love (2013), and, Love Your Life (2016), while she released two holiday albums, Christmastime (2006) and Christmas Once Again (2009). Her last four musical works charted on various Billboard magazine charts.

Early life
Weeks was born Hilary Novakovich,  on March 7, 1970, in Colorado, while she was raised in Alaska. She graduated from Brigham Young University with her baccalaureate of arts in 1993 from their music department.

Music career
Her music recording career started in 1996, with the studio album, He Hears Me, that was released by Deseret Book. She then went onto release four more studio albums, Lead Me Home in 1998, I Will Not Forget in 2000, Day of Praise in 2004, If I Only Had Today on September 17, 2008.  While her next two albums, Every Step and Say Love, released on October 25, 2011 and September 9, 2013, correspondingly, while they charted each on three Billboard magazine charts, The Billboard 200 at Nos. 102 and 161, respectively, Christian Albums at Nos. 6 and 9, correspondingly, and Independent Albums at Nos. 23 and 30,  respectively. She was the first Mormon to have an album peak in the Top-10 of the Christian Albums chart. The eighth studio album, Love Your Life, was released on September 16, 2016, and it charted on the Christian Albums chart at No. 7, and Independent Albums chart at No. 24.

She has released two holiday albums, Christmastime, on November 7, 2006, and her most commercially successful one, Christmas Once Again, on October 13, 2009, where it peaked at Nos. 26 and 40 on the Holiday Albums and Heatseekers Albums charts.

Personal life
She is married to Timothy Weeks, and they have four daughters, residing in Utah. Weeks was called by Forbes one of the "'40 Women to Watch Over 40,'" .

Discography
Studio albums

Holiday albums

References

External links
 

1970 births
Living people
American Latter Day Saints
Musicians from Alaska
Musicians from Colorado
Musicians from Utah
Songwriters from Alaska
Songwriters from Colorado
Songwriters from Utah
Brigham Young University alumni